Central Park is a stop on the Luas light-rail tram system in Dún Laoghaire - Rathdown, south of Dublin, Ireland. It opened in 2010 as a stop on the extension of the Green Line south from Sandyford to Brides Glen.

Location and access
The stop is located adjacent to a business park of the same name. Leopardstown Park Hospital is on the other side of the stop, and Leopardstown Racecourse and Kilmacud Crokes GAA are also within walking distance.

The stop has two entrances: the northbound platform opens directly onto a public plaza in the centre of the business park, and a specially built pathway connects the southbound platform to an unnamed road leading to the hospital.

To the south of the stop, the tram line slopes upwards, then passes the business park's car park on a viaduct which then takes the line over the M50 motorway. To the north, it cuts through the business park on its own right of way, then crosses a road junction on a curved viaduct and runs alongside Burton Hall Road, which it then crosses, turning onto the side of Blackthorn Avenue, taking it to Sandyford.

References

Luas Green Line stops in Dún Laoghaire–Rathdown
Railway stations opened in 2010
2010 establishments in Ireland
Railway stations in the Republic of Ireland opened in the 21st century